David Finlay may refer to:

 David Finlay (VC) (1893–1916), Scottish recipient of the Victoria Cross
 David Finlay (wrestler) (born 1993), German-born Northern Irish professional wrestler
 David White Finlay (1840–1923), Scottish physician and yachtsman
 Fit Finlay (born 1958), also known as Dave Finlay, Northern Irish wrestling trainer and professional wrestler and father of wrestler David Finlay

See also
David Finley (disambiguation)